Felix John McCormick (May 21, 1905 – March 30, 1971) was a professional football player with the Orange Tornadoes of the National Football League. McCormick played college football at Bucknell University prior to playing professionally. On December 1, 1929, McCormick completed a 35-yard field goal to give the Orange Tornadoes the win over the Staten Island Stapletons, 3-0. In 1926, he completed a 53-yard drop kick with Bucknell University.

Later life
McCormick taught in the Bloomfield school system from 1941 to 1948. He later became a professor of business administration at Columbia University.

References

External links
1929 NFL season summary

1905 births
1971 deaths
Players of American football from Newark, New Jersey
Orange Tornadoes players
Newark Tornadoes players
Bucknell Bison football players